Fox 42 may refer to one of the following television stations in the United States, affiliated with the Fox Broadcasting Company:

Current
KJNE-LD in Jonesboro, Arkansas
Local translator for KJNB-LD
KPTM in Omaha, Nebraska

Former
KBVO-TV (now KEYE-TV) in Austin, Texas (1986 to 1995)